The Royal Hospice of San Fernando (Spanish: Real Hospicio de San Fernando) is a former hospice located in Madrid, Spain.

The building now houses the Museo de Historia de Madrid.
It was declared Bien de Interés Cultural in 1919.

Among the boys from poor families living there in the 19th Century was Pablo Iglesias, who would later become a founder of Socialism in Spain, and Iglesias' younger brother who would die young of tuberculosis.

References 

Buildings and structures in Justicia neighborhood, Madrid
Bien de Interés Cultural landmarks in Madrid